The Immigration Act of 1891, also known as the 1891 Immigration Act, was a modification of the Immigration Act of 1882, focusing on immigration rules and enforcement mechanisms for foreigners arriving from countries other than China. It was the second major federal legislation related to the mechanisms and authority of immigration enforcement, the first being the Immigration Act of 1882 (there were other, more minor pieces of legislation passed in the 1880s). The law was passed on March 3, 1891, at the end of the term of the 51st United States Congress, and signed into law by then United States President Benjamin Harrison.

Historical context

Immigration Act of 1882 

The Immigration Act of 1882 was the first major federal legislation describing a framework for regulation of immigration. The Act allowed for head taxes on certain arriving migrants, and allowed the use of this to fund a federal immigration bureaucracy.

Other acts 

Between 1882 and 1891, some other acts governing immigration were passed. The key ones are below:

 Alien Contract Labor Law, passed February 26, 1885, made it unlawful to import aliens into the United States under contract for the performance of labor or services of any kind. It was amended in February 1887 to make it enforceable by the Secretary of the Treasury.
 Payson Act of 1887 restricted the ownership of real estate in the United States to American citizens and those who have lawfully declared their intentions to become citizens, with certain specific exceptions.
 Act of October 19, 1888 stated that any immigrant who had landed in violation of the Alien Contract Labor Law could be expelled within one year of arrival (this would be reiterated in the Immigration Act of 1891, with additional details).

Related legislation on Chinese exclusion 

A parallel set of legislative, executive, and judicial changes was unfolding in the domain of Chinese exclusion. The key pieces of legislation were:

 The Page Act of 1875, that banned forced laborers and women suspected of prostitution from Asia
 Angell Treaty of 1880 placed a moratorium on migration from China, amending the Burlingame Treaty
 Chinese Exclusion Act (1882), banning for ten years the migration of Chinese skilled and unskilled laborers.
 Scott Act (1888), amending the Chinese Exclusion Act to also ban the re-entry of Chinese laborers who had already been living in the United States.
 Geary Act (1892), extending the Chinese Exclusion Act for another ten years, and also requiring certificates of residence from existing Chinese to prove that they had entered lawfully (i.e., prior to the Chinese Exclusion Act). Those without certificates of residence could be deported.

Provisions

Additional classes of excludable aliens 

Section 1 of the 1891 Act relisted categories of excludable aliens, adding some new categories. The new types of excludable aliens included persons likely to become public charges, persons suffering from certain contagious disease, felons, persons convicted of other crimes or misdemeanors, polygamists, aliens assisted by others by payment of passage.

New border procedures and extended authority to land borders 

The Act specified that the officers in charge of any vessel arriving by sea had to submit a list of passengers with their biographical information to the immigration inspectors at the port. Requirements of this sort had been part of United States federal law since the requirement for a manifest of immigrants in Section 4 of the Steerage Act of 1819. However, in this case the list needed to be submitted immediately upon arrival and was used to inspect aliens prior to admitting them. The inspectors at ports of entry had the authority to conduct a medical examination of aliens suspected of being unfit or having dangerous diseases, marking the beginning of medical exclusion of immigrants in the United States. Aliens who were detained for a medical examination were still considered to not have formally entered the United States.

Whereas the Immigration Act of 1882 had only regulated the coastal borders of the United States, the Immigration Act of 1891 extended this authority to land borders with Canada and Mexico. It directed the Secretary of the Treasury to prescribe rules for the enforcement along land borders that would balance the interests of immigration law enforcement with the goal to not obstruct or unnecessarily delay, impede, or annoy passengers in ordinary travel between the countries.

New bureaucratic office to coordinate immigration enforcement 

Section 7 of the 1891 Act created the Office of Superintendent of Immigration. The new executive or bureaucratic office would comprise three clerks and a superintendent appointed by the president, who all worked under the jurisdiction of the secretary of the treasury. The Superintendent oversaw a new corps of U.S. immigrant inspectors at the country's principal ports of entry.

Authority to deport 

An Act of October 19, 1888 had established the authority to remove migrants who should not have been allowed to enter for up to one year after their arrival. The Immigration Act of 1891 reiterated the authority to remove aliens. The following two provisions were relevant:

 Section 10 specified that an alien may be required to depart by the same vessel used for arrival, and the captain or master of the ship was required to cooperate, with a minimum fine of $300 for non-cooperation and no permission for departure if a ship had unpaid fines.
 Section 11 allowed for the deportation of any aliens who had arrived in violation of the laws (i.e., if the alien was in one of the excludable categories) at the expense of whoever facilitated the alien's entry.

Penalties and restrictions on abetting migration 

In addition to Sections 10 and 11, that pushed the financial responsibility for deporting an alien onto the vessel or persons who had brought the alien in, other provisions aimed to penalize the abetting of migration. Sections 3 and 4 forbade advertising journeys to migrants as a way of getting jobs, updating the Alien Contract Labor Law. Section 5 exempted ministers, professors, and others in skilled professions, as well as relatives of United States citizens, from the provisions of Sections 3 and 4.

Subsequent events

Court challenges 

The first challenge to the Act was Nishimura Ekiu v. United States. Nishimura Ekiu, a female citizen of Japan, arrived at the United States from Yokohama, Japan on May 7, 1891, and was denied entry under the Immigration Act of 1891. She sued for habeas corpus, and challenged the constitutionality of some provisions of the Immigration Act of 1891. The case was decided against Ekiu and in favor of the United States.

A later case, Yamataya v. Fisher (also known as the Japanese Immigrant Case) challenged the constitutionality of the provisions to exclude and deport immigrants, arguing that these provisions violated the due process clause of the United States Constitution. This was the first time the Supreme Court allowed judicial review of a procedural due process claim. The case was decided against the Japanese petitioner Yamataya, and found Yamataya to be deportable.

Opening of Ellis Island 

Ellis Island, an immigrant inspection station in Upper New York Bay (near New York City) on the East Coast of the United States opened on January 2, 1892, shortly after the passage of the Immigration Act of 1891. It would be the busiest immigration inspection. Immigrant inspection at Ellis Island was carried out as per the specifications of the Immigration Act of 1891. The medical examination to determine medical excludability (as described in Section 1 of the Act) and detention of migrants with medical conditions were carried out at the Ellis Island Immigrant Hospital located in the south side of the island.

Changes to structure of immigration bureaucracy 

A congressional act of March 2, 1895 renamed the Office of Immigration as the Bureau of Immigration and changed the title of superintendent of immigration to commissioner-general of immigration.

An Act of February 14, 1903 transferred the Bureau of Immigration from the Treasury Department to the newly created Department of Commerce and Labor.  An "immigrant fund" created from collection of immigrants' head tax financed the Immigration Service until 1909, when Congress replaced the fund with an annual appropriation.

See also 
 Nishimura Ekiu v. United States: Supreme Court reviewing the act
 Yamataya v. Fisher: Supreme Court reviewing the act
 Immigration Act of 1882

References 

1891 in American law
United States federal immigration and nationality legislation